Kauko Laasonen (born 8 January 1951) is a Finnish archer. He competed in the men's individual event at the 1976 Summer Olympics.

References

External links
 

1951 births
Living people
Finnish male archers
Olympic archers of Finland
Archers at the 1976 Summer Olympics
People from Kesälahti
Sportspeople from North Karelia